Woodhouse Mill railway station was opened in 1840 by the North Midland Railway on its line between Rotherham Masborough and Chesterfield.

It was situated to the south of the main A57 road shortly after this left the City of Sheffield and served Woodhouse Mill, near Sheffield, Orgreave, Fence and (Aston cum Aughton), all within Rotherham, South Yorkshire.

It may initially have been simply a halt, but the Midland Railway installed an island platform with a timber and brick booking office at its centre. Nearby was Orgreave Coke Works and Fence Colliery. It closed in 1953.

The station was located between that at Treeton and the original North Midland station at Beighton.  The line is still in use today but has been a freight only route since July 1954, although it is very occasionally used as a diversionary route and by excursions not calling at Sheffield. It serves as a bypass line which keeps freight trains away from the congested lines through central Sheffield.

References

Notes

Sources

External links

Disused railway stations in Rotherham
Railway stations in Great Britain opened in 1840
Railway stations in Great Britain closed in 1953
Former Midland Railway stations